Hudecki is a surname. Notable people with the surname include:

Dylan Hudecki, Canadian musician
Peter Hudecki (born 1954), Canadian animator
Phyllis Hudecki, American educator
Stanley Hudecki (1916–1988), Canadian politician